Koleps is a genus of moths in the family Blastobasidae. It contains only one species, Koleps angulatus, which is found in Costa Rica.

The length of the forewings is about 6.3 mm. The forewings are brown intermixed with pale greyish-yellow and dark-brown scales. The hindwings are translucent brown.

Etymology
The generic name is derived from the Greek koleps (meaning bent knee) and refers to the acutely angled base of the costa of the male genitalia. The specific name angulatus is derived from Latin angulus (meaning angle) and refers to the acutely angled base of the costa of the male valva.

References

Blastobasidae genera
Monotypic moth genera